Chusana Numkanitsorn is a professional footballer from Thailand. He is currently playing for ACDC in Thai League 3 as a  left-winger.

References

External links
 
 http://player.7mth.com/393758/index.shtml
 https://www.siamsport.co.th/player/398051/chusana-numkanitsorn

1989 births
Living people
Chusana Numkanitsorn
Association football forwards
Chusana Numkanitsorn
Chusana Numkanitsorn
Chusana Numkanitsorn